Universities New Zealand - Te Pōkai Tara is the peak body representing universities in New Zealand.

It assumes the roles previously held by New Zealand Vice-Chancellors' Committee and the University Grants Committee which were founded in the Universities Act of 1961 which dissolved the University of New Zealand into its constituent institutions. Universities New Zealand control some scholarships and consistent academic grading. It also acts as a vehicle for consortia deals on copyright and other commercial interests and campaigns for better government funding of universities.

Graduate Longitudinal Study New Zealand 
The Graduate Longitudinal Study New Zealand is a survey launched in 2011. Commissioned by Universities New Zealand, the study is government-funded and aims to determine the ongoing impact of a tertiary education on graduates’ lives. About 14,000 final-year students will be surveyed in 2011 and again in 2013, 2016 and 2021. The Graduate Longitudinal Study New Zealand will be the most comprehensive study of a country's graduates. The study aims to understand the value of a New Zealand tertiary education by exploring how graduates fare in the years following university, in terms of their lifestyles, employment, career development, and their health and well-being.

See also
Tertiary education in New Zealand

References

External links  
 

Higher education in New Zealand